Youssra Zekrani (born 7 January 1995) is a Moroccan fencer. She competed in the women's foil event at the 2016 Summer Olympics.

References

External links
 

1995 births
Living people
Moroccan female foil fencers
Olympic fencers of Morocco
Fencers at the 2016 Summer Olympics
Place of birth missing (living people)